is a military appointment to a sub-subunit leader, e.g. platoon leader, belonging to the Non-commissioned officer (NCO) rank group or junior officer. A  leads or  commands normally a subunit that is called in German language  (en: platoon, platoon-size unit, or detachment).

Germany 
 of the Bundeswehr is an appointment. The  is a subunit leader and commands a Zug (in the following platoon) that – depending on the service, branch, or branch of service – normally contains 30 to 60 service members or soldiers. The Bundeswehr platoon consists of some groups; some platoons build a company (infantry), battery (artillery), or squadron (Air Force).

However, in the German special command and support troops to platoon leader might be appointed an OF2-rank captain or an experienced NCO  (OR9) as well.

In flying squadrons of all Bundeswehr military branches the appointment flight commander/leader is approximately equivalent to platoon leader. Assigned will be an OF2-rank captain or a staff officer, because pilot officers they themselves are normally officer ranks.

Nazi Germany 

Insignia

Switzerland 
Here the platoon is commanded by an OF1-rank 2nd Lieutenant or 1st Lieutenant.

Austria 
As opposed to Germany and Switzerland, in the Austrian Bundesheer the designation of platoon leader is Zugskommandant. It should not be mixed up with the enlisted rank

References 

Military ranks of Germany
Military ranks of Switzerland